Laljibhai Chaturbhai Mer is an Indian politician and former Member of legislative assembly for Dhandhuka constituency as Bhartiya Janata Party candidate. In 2018, he joined Indian National Congress party. Mer belong to the Koli caste of Gujarat.

During his resignation, he said that BJP is anti-farmer party so he can not be in this party.

References 

Koli people
Living people
Year of birth missing (living people)
Indian National Congress politicians from Gujarat
Bharatiya Janata Party politicians from Gujarat